Noor Zafar Khan (born 8 August 1994) is a Pakistani television actress. She made her acting debut with a role of Maheen in Kaise Huaye Benaam and later appeared as Noor-ul-Ain in Preet Na Kariyo Koi (2015). She is known for playing a role of Noor in Hum TV's Bharam (2019). Khan was last seen playing Sawera in Hum TV's mystery drama Chalawa.

Early life
Khan was born on 8 August 1995 in Medina, Saudi Arabia to a Pakistani father and a Lebanese mother. She spent the early years of her life in Medina and moved to Pakistan with her family at the age of 7. She was schooled in Karachi. She has two sisters, Sarah and Ayesha, and a brother called Hamza.

Career
Khan started her career with modeling and appeared in several television commercials. She then played supporting roles in the political drama Preet Na Kariyo Koi (2015) and the religious drama Saya-e-Dewar Bhi Nahi (2016), before earning recognition with the romantic drama Gustakh Ishq (2017). In 2017, she appeared as Noor in Urdu1's short film Noor opposite Asim Azhar. She played the role of Zoya in Tau Dil Ka Kiya Hua (2017–2018) and made special appearance in Angeline Malik's anthology series Kabhi Band Kabhi Baja (2018).

Television

Other appearance

References

External links

Living people
Pakistani television actresses
Pashtun women
21st-century Pakistani actresses
People from Medina
Actresses from Karachi
Pakistani people of Lebanese descent
1994 births